Kevin M. Iiams is a United States Marine Corps lieutenant general who serves as the commander of the United States Marine Corps Training and Education Command since August 2, 2021. He most recently served as the Assistant Deputy Commandant for Combat Development and Integration of the United States Marine Corps and Deputy Commanding General of the Marine Corps Combat Development Command. Previously, he was the Commanding General of the 3d Marine Aircraft Wing. In April 2021, he was nominated for promotion to lieutenant general and assignment to reassume his command of the U.S. Marine Corps Training and Education Command, replacing LtGen Lewis A. Craparotta.

Awards and decorations

References

External links

Year of birth missing (living people)
Living people
Place of birth missing (living people)
United States Marine Corps generals